Kleeware is a brand of plastic toy developed and marketed by the company O & M Kleeman in the 1950s in the UK. The range of toys was extensive and included soldiers, boats, cars, model houses and dolls.

References

Toy companies of the United Kingdom
Toy soldier manufacturing companies